The Center for American Progress (CAP) is a public policy research and advocacy organization which presents a liberal viewpoint on economic and social issues. It has its headquarters in Washington, D.C.

The president and chief executive officer of CAP is Patrick Gaspard, a former diplomat and labor leader, who served most recently as the president of the Open Society Foundations. Gaspard succeeded Neera Tanden, who was appointed special advisor to President Joe Biden in May 2021. Tanden previously worked for the Obama and Clinton administrations and for Hillary Clinton's campaigns. The first president and CEO was John Podesta, who has served as White House Chief of Staff to U.S. President Bill Clinton and as the chairman of the 2016 presidential campaign of Hillary Clinton. Podesta remained with the organization as chairman of the board until he joined the Obama White House staff in December 2013. Tom Daschle is the current chairman.

The Center for American Progress has a youth-engagement organization, Generation Progress, and a sister advocacy organization, the Center for American Progress Action Fund (CAPAF).

History and mission

The Center for American Progress was created in 2003 as a Democratic alternative to conservative think tanks such as The Heritage Foundation and the American Enterprise Institute (AEI).

Citing Podesta's influence in the formation of the Obama Administration, Michael Scherer in a November 2008 article in Time stated that "not since  The Heritage Foundation helped guide Ronald Reagan's transition in 1981 has a single outside group held so much sway". In 2011, the Washington Post's Jason Horowitz described the Center for American Progress as "Washington’s leading liberal think tank," and "an incessant advocate for a broad progressive agenda and as such, a sharp thorn in President Obama’s left side." Sarah Rosen Wartell, a co-founder and former executive vice-president of the CAP, was later named president of the Urban Institute

In 2021, CAP was described as "the most influential think tank of the Biden era" by Politico.

Activities

ThinkProgress

ThinkProgress, active during the years 2005–2019, was an American progressive news website affiliated with the Center for American Progress but with editorial independence. In September 2019, 'ThinkProgress" was shut down when CAP was unable to find a publisher willing to take it over. The news site was then "folded into CAP's online presence" to "focus on analysis from CAP scholars and CAP Action staff."

Generation Progress
Generation Progress was launched in February 2005 as "the youth arm of the Center for American Progress". According to the organization, Generation Progress partners with over a million millennials.

Center for American Progress Action Fund
Formerly known simply as the American Progress Action Fund, the Center for American Progress Action Fund (CAP Action) is a "sister advocacy organization" and is organizationally and financially separate from CAP, although they share many staff and a physical address. Politico wrote in April 2011 that it "openly runs political advocacy campaigns, and plays a central role in the Democratic Party’s infrastructure, and the new reporting staff down the hall isn’t exactly walled off from that message machine, nor does it necessarily keep its distance from liberal groups organizing advocacy campaigns targeting conservatives". Whereas CAP is a 501(c)(3) nonprofit, CAP Action is a 501(c)(4), allowing it to devote more funds to lobbying. In 2003, George Soros promised to financially support the organization by donating up to $3 million. CAP Action is headed by Neera Tanden.

Launched in 2017, "The Moscow Project" is one of its initiatives.

Washington Center for Equitable Growth 
The Washington Center for Equitable Growth, also known simply as "Equitable Growth", is a research and grantmaking organization founded in 2013 and "housed at the Center for American Progress". Equitable Growth funds academic research in economics and other social sciences, with a particular interest in government's role in the distribution of economic growth and the role of public perceptions of fairness in shaping government policy.

Science Progress 
Science Progress was an internet publication about progressive science and technology policy. Science Progress was a project of the Center for American Progress. Its mission was "to improve the understanding of science among policymakers and other thought leaders and to develop exciting, progressive ideas about innovation in science and technology for the United States in the 21st Century." It began publication on 4 October 2007, the fiftieth anniversary of the launch of Sputnik 1. Content on the web site included news, in-depth essays, and text- and audio-based interviews. The Science Progress staff included Editor-In-Chief Jonathan D. Moreno.

Disability Justice Initiative 
In July 2018, the Center for American Progress recruited former Obama staffer and National Council on Disability executive director Rebecca Cokley to lead its new project focused on disability rights advocacy. Senator Tammy Duckworth spoke at the first event announcing creation of the new project, which is housed within CAP's Poverty to Prosperity Program. The Disability Justice Initiative became the first such project at a mainstream public policy advocacy organization not already focused on disability.

Policies

Health care

In 2017, the center opposed Bernie Sanders' single-payer health plan. Critics said that this was because of funding from the health care industry, such as the Blue Cross Blue Shield Association, the Health Care Service Corporation and America's Health Insurance Plans, who would be eliminated under Sanders' plan. In 2018, the center proposed an alternative to single payer that would offer patients and employers a choice between government coverage and private insurance.

Criticism

Pro-UAE, pro-Saudi policy
In October 2016, the Intercept reported that United Arab Emirates Ambassador to the US Yousef Al Otaiba praised "a CAP report released [in October 2016] that advocates for continued cooperation with Gulf states like Saudi Arabia and the United Arab Emirates."

In January 2019, two CAP staffers were fired after an investigation concerning the leaking of an internal email exchange involving discussions over the phrasing of CAP's response to the murder of The Washington Post contributing columnist Jamal Khashoggi. CAP released a statement noting that while they conducted an investigation into the leaks, this was not the cause for the firings.

Lack of transparency for funding sources
Some open government groups, such as the Sunlight Foundation and the Campaign Legal Center, criticized the center's failure to disclose its contributors, particularly because it was so influential to the Obama administration. CAP's website states that corporate donors are not allowed to remain anonymous. Nathan Robinson, writing in 2018 for Current Affairs wrote that CAP "continues to conceal the identities of many of its largest donors." He also criticized CAP for receiving "shady donations" and for a grant of $200,000 to the American Enterprise Institute in 2018.

Israel controversies

Allegations of antisemitic language
CAP was criticized in 2012 by several Jewish organizations after its employees, Zaid Jilani and Ali Gharib, "publicly used language that could be construed as anti-Israel or even anti-Semitic". Bloggers associated with CAP published several posts using phrases such as "apartheid" and "Israel-firsters", which the American Jewish Committee described as "hateful" and called on CAP to disassociate themselves from these statements. The latter phrase, "Israel-firsters", which was used in reference to US supporters of Israel, was also criticized by the Anti-Defamation League and described as anti-semitic, including by Faiz Shakir, then the vice president of CAP. Officials at CAP said the “inappropriate” language came only in personal tweets—not on CAP's website or its ThinkProgress blog. The Tweets were deleted, and the authors apologized.

Allegations of suppression of criticism of Israel
In 2015, however, other writers criticized CAP for what they saw as censorship of reasonable comments critical of Israeli settlements in the occupied West Bank and other policies. Based on leaked emails, columnist Glenn Greenwald, for example, wrote that CAP had deleted references to Israeli settlement policies in reports by their staffers.

Greenwald and others also criticized CAP for hosting a meeting with Israeli Prime Minister Benjamin Netanyahu, while Netanyahu was hostile to the Obama Administration. Greenwald described CAP's positions as "servitude to AIPAC and pandering to Netanyahu." Eighteen organizations and over one hundred academics signed an open letter, circulated by Jewish Voice for Peace and the Arab American Institute, against the meeting. 26,300 people signed a petition opposing the meeting.

WikiLeaks 2016 Hillary Clinton campaign controversy
After the release by WikiLeaks of hacked Podesta emails, the Center for American Progress was criticized for emails sent between John Halpin, a Senior Fellow at the Center for American Progress, and Jennifer Palmieri, a Hillary Clinton campaign team member. The Washington Post characterized the comments as "joking"; Kellyanne Conway and others called them anti-Catholic attacks.

Handling of sexual harassment accusations
In April 2018, BuzzFeed News reported that female employees of CAP had complained of sexual harassment by CAP employee Benton Strong to human resources and management. Two anonymous employees alleged retaliation for reporting Strong's behavior, one of them including her allegations in an exit memo when leaving CAP. However, CAP maintains that no retaliation took place and an internal investigation concluded the same. In response to the first complaint, Strong received a warning from CAP management. After the second complaint, he was suspended for three days without pay. He was already resigning to take up a position elsewhere, and these three days coincided with the final three days of his employment with CAP.

After the publication of the BuzzFeed story, CAP president Neera Tanden unintentionally used the first name of one of the anonymous women during an all-staff meeting to address their handling of the sexual harassment allegations.

Michael Bloomberg

In February 2020, The New York Times reported that the center had removed reporting of New York City police surveillance of Muslim communities from a 2015 report, allegedly out of deference to Michael Bloomberg, who had given the center grants worth $1.5 million. Yasmine Taeb, an author of the report, said that they were instructed to remove the chapter or make dramatic revisions, alleging this was "because of how it was going to be perceived by Mayor Bloomberg." CAP officials disputed her account, characterizing the changes as editorial decisions: detailed discussion of NYC policing was off-topic because the report had been "commissioned to examine right-wing groups targeting Muslims with explicit bigotry and conspiracy theories." Bloomberg told The New York Times reporters he was unaware of any such dispute at CAP; in 2017, he contributed an additional $400,000.

Funding
The Center for American Progress is a 501(c)(3) organization under U.S. Internal Revenue Code. In 2014, CAP received $45 million from a variety of sources, including individuals, foundations, labor unions, and corporations. From 2003 to 2007, CAP received about $15 million in grants from 58 foundations. Major individual donors include George Soros, Peter Lewis, Steve Bing, and Herb and Marion Sandler. The center receives undisclosed sums from corporate donors. In December 2013, the organization released a list of its corporate donors, which include Walmart, CitiGroup, Wells Fargo, defense contractor Northrop Grumman, America's Health Insurance Plans, and Eli Lilly and Company.

In 2015, CAP released a partial list of its donors, which included 28 anonymous donors accounting for at least $5 million in contributions. Named donors included the Bill and Melinda Gates Foundation and the Embassy of the United Arab Emirates, which each gave between $500,000 and $999,999. CAP's top donors include Walmart and Citigroup, each of which have given between $100,000 and $499,000. Other large CAP donors include Goldman Sachs, Bank of America, Google, Time Warner, and Pharmaceutical Research and Manufacturers of America.

Non-profit filings

See also
 Policy Network

References

External links
 
Center for American Progress Action Fund
Campus Progress
Climate Progress
ThinkProgress
 
Neera Tanden on Bloomberg

 
Political and economic think tanks in the United States
Liberalism in the United States
Sustainability organizations
Charities based in Washington, D.C.
Foreign policy and strategy think tanks in the United States
Organizations established in 2003
2003 establishments in Washington, D.C.
Progressive organizations in the United States
Advocacy groups in the United States
501(c)(3) organizations
John Podesta